Aat van Noort (30 April 1908 – 1 March 1998) was a Dutch middle-distance runner. She competed in the women's 800 metres at the 1928 Summer Olympics.

References

1908 births
1998 deaths
Athletes (track and field) at the 1928 Summer Olympics
Dutch female middle-distance runners
Olympic athletes of the Netherlands
Sportspeople from Leiden
20th-century Dutch women